Maycol Andriani (born 17 September 1987) is an Italian footballer who plays for the Serie D club Ciliverghe. Andriani played two seasons in the Lega Pro, from 2007 to 2009.

Biography
Born in Verona, Veneto, Andriani started his career with Chievo. In 2006–07 season, he was loaned to Serie D club P.B. Vercelli along with Leonardo Moracci. In the next season, he left for the Serie C2 team Sansovino in co-ownership deal, along with Moracci (loan), goalkeeper Antonino Saviano, defender Marcus N'Ze, midfielder Luca Spinetti and forward Xhulian Rrudho. In June 2008, Chievo bought him back by winning an auction between the two clubs.
In 2008–09 season he left for Lega Pro Seconda Divisione club Sambonifacese along with Fabio Lima de Silva and Marco Petresini. In June 2009 Chievo gave up the remaining 50% registration rights. Andriani then returned to Serie D for Castellana.

References

External links
 
 LaSerieD.com Profile 

Italian footballers
Association football midfielders
Footballers from Verona
1987 births
Living people
A.C. ChievoVerona players
F.C. Pro Vercelli 1892 players
A.C. Sambonifacese players
A.C. Montichiari players
A.C. Sansovino players
Serie D players